Organic Preparations and Procedures International is a bimonthly  scientific journal focusing on organic chemists engaged in synthesis. Topics include original preparative chemistry in association with the synthesis of organic and organometallic compounds.

Organic chemistry journals
English-language journals